Apollo 3 may refer to:

 Apollo 3 (band), a German rock band
 AS-203, an unmanned Saturn IB launch which supported the Apollo program but carried no Apollo spacecraft, intended to be launched third in the series
 AS-202, intended as the second unmanned Apollo/Saturn IB flight, but launched after AS-203 because of spacecraft delays
 SA-3 (Apollo), the third test flight of the Saturn I rocket and part of Project Highwater

See also
 List of Apollo missions